The 1998 Kerry Senior Football Championship was the 98th staging of the Kerry Senior Football Championship since its establishment by the Kerry County Board in 1889. The draw for the opening round fixtures took place on 24 February 1998.

East Kerry entered the championship as the defending champions.

The final was played on 4 October 1998 at Austin Stack Park in Tralee, between East Kerry and St. Kieran's, in what was their first ever meeting in the final. East Kerry won the match by 2-13 to 1-10 to claim their sixth championship title overall and a second title in succession.

Seán McElligott was the championship's top scorer with 1-33.

Results

Preliminary round

Round 1

Quarter-finals

Semi-finals

Final

Championship statistics

Top scorers

Overall

In a single game

Miscellaneous
 St. Kieran's qualified for the final for the first time since 1988.

References

Kerry Senior Football Championship
1998 in Gaelic football